Oona Hart is a model and actress from Evanston, Illinois.  She played Lynette in Vanilla Sky (2001) and also had appearances in the TV series Sliders and the film Love Jones.   She is well known for her Levi's jeans ad in which she is chased into a tree by a dog. Oona and her husband, Danny Timmis homeschool their kids.

References

External links

American film actresses
American television actresses
Actresses from Evanston, Illinois
Year of birth missing (living people)
Living people
Female models from Illinois
21st-century American women